The 1967 Columbia Lions football team was an American football team that represented Columbia University during the 1967 NCAA University Division football season. Columbia finished last in the Ivy League. 

In their eleventh and final season under head coach Aldo "Buff" Donelli, the Lions compiled a 2–7 record and were outscored 205 to 109. Donald Hubert and Thomas Reed were the team captains.  

The Lions were winless (0–7) in conference play, finishing last in the Ivy League standings. Columbia was outscored 178 to 68 by Ivy opponents. 

Columbia played its home games at Baker Field in Upper Manhattan, in New York City.

Schedule

References

Columbia
Columbia Lions football seasons
Columbia Lions football